Luis López (8 June 1969 – 9 October 1995) was a Mexican gymnast. He competed in eight events at the 1992 Summer Olympics.

References

External links
 

1969 births
1995 deaths
Mexican male artistic gymnasts
Olympic gymnasts of Mexico
Gymnasts at the 1992 Summer Olympics
Place of birth missing
Pan American Games medalists in gymnastics
Pan American Games silver medalists for Mexico
Pan American Games bronze medalists for Mexico
Gymnasts at the 1991 Pan American Games
Medalists at the 1991 Pan American Games
New Mexico Lobos men's gymnasts
20th-century Mexican people